Christian Gebauer (born 20 December 1993) is an Austrian professional footballer who plays as a right winger for German  club  Arminia Bielefeld.

References

1993 births
Living people
Association football wingers
Austrian footballers
Austrian Football Bundesliga players
2. Liga (Austria) players
Austrian Regionalliga players
Bundesliga players
2. Bundesliga players
WSG Tirol players
SC Rheindorf Altach players
Arminia Bielefeld players
FC Ingolstadt 04 players
Austrian expatriate footballers
Austrian expatriate sportspeople in Germany
Expatriate footballers in Germany